A garden pond is a water feature constructed in a garden or designed landscape, normally for aesthetic purposes, to provide wildlife habitat, or for swimming.

Habitat

Garden ponds can be excellent wildlife habitats, and can make a contribution to the protection of freshwater wildlife. Invertebrate animals such as dragonflies and water beetles, and amphibians can colonise new ponds quickly. Garden pond owners have the potential to make many original and valuable observations about the ecology of small waterbodies, which garden ponds replicate.

Garden ponds also cause problems. In particular, garden ponds can be pathways for the spread of invasive non-native plants. In the UK the non-native species Crassula helmsii and Myriophyllum aquaticum, which cause considerable practical problems in protecting freshwaters, are both escaped invasive species from garden ponds.

Conditions

Ponds may be created by natural processes or by people; however, the origin of the hole in the ground makes little difference to the kind of wildlife that will be found in the pond. Much more important is whether the pond is polluted or clean, how close it is to other wetlands and its depth, particularly whether it dries out from time to time and how many fish (if any) there are.

Naturally, ponds vary more in their physical and chemical conditions from day to day, and even during the day, than other freshwaters, like rivers. People often install pumps in garden ponds to counter these natural tendencies, particularly to maintain higher levels of dissolved oxygen: although this is probably not necessary for wildlife generally, it may be essential to keep fish in a small pond. For ponds with polluted nutrient-rich tapwater added to them, filters can be used to reduce the abundance of algae.

Water supply and loss
Ponds outside of gardens are fed by four main water sources: rain, inflows (springs and streams), surface runoff, and groundwater. The wildlife value of ponds is greatly affected by the extent to which these water sources are unpolluted. Garden ponds are generally not fed by inflows or groundwater, except in the larger and rural gardens. Usually the pond will be filled by a combination of tap water, rainwater, and surface runoff – and lost to evaporation.

In soils which lack natural clay, additional water loss to drainage and permeation is prevented by a liner. Pond liners are PVC or EPDM foils that are placed between the soil of the pond bed and the water. Liners can also be made from puddled clay, and ponds on free-draining soils can even be self-sealing with fine sediments washed into the pond.

Seasonal ponds

One can make a garden pond / koi pond that generally ranges in size from 150 gallons to around 10,000 gallons.  However, if evaporation exceeds the amount of water added, the pond may dry out during summer. This is not harmful biologically because many freshwater plants and animals (perhaps half of all species) are well adapted to periods of drought, and worldwide so-called 'temporary ponds' (ponds which usually dry out once a year) are an important natural habitat type. However, in a garden, a pond which dries out in summer may be a bit disappointing for the owner since this is the time when most people will be spending time enjoying their pond. And of course some animals, particularly fish, cannot survive periods of drought. Amphibians, on the other hand, often benefit from ponds which dry out because this removes fish, the major predators of tadpoles and newtpoles and, provided the larvae emerge before the pond dries out, the drought presents no problems for the amphibians.

Natural ponds, natural pools and swimming ponds 

Ponds or swimming ponds can be constructed by an isolating membrane or membranes or (on an organic model sometimes called natural pools) contained by layer of loam. For all variants no chemicals or devices disinfect or maintain water, the water is instead cleared through use of biological filters, aquatic plants or other organisms used in water purification (zooplankton).

The first such pools were built in the early 1980s in Austria, where they are known as "Schwimmteiche". The first was built by Werner Gamerith and Richard Weixler in Gamerith's private garden in the 1980s. The market slowly grew, and by 2016 there were around 20,000 such swimming ponds in Europe.

The first public swimming pool in North America built and maintained in this way, was finished at Webber Park in Minneapolis in 2015.

An organization called International Organization for Natural Bathing Waters (IOB) sets standards for such pools.

See also 
 Biotope
 Koi pond
 Water garden

References

Further reading
 

Garden features
Outdoor recreation
Ponds
Bodies of water